The Sultan Salahuddin Abdul Aziz Shah Mosque is the state mosque of Selangor, Malaysia. It is located in Shah Alam. It is the country's largest mosque and also the second largest mosque in Southeast Asia by capacity. Its most distinguishing feature is its large blue and silver dome. The mosque has four minarets, one erected at each of the corners.

History 
The mosque was commissioned by the late Sultan Salahuddin Abdul Aziz, when he declared Shah Alam as the new capital of Selangor on 14 February 1974. Construction began in 1982 and finished on 11 March 1988. The mosque is also known as the Blue Mosque owing to its blue dome.

Records 
In its early years, the mosque was listed in the Guinness Book of Records as having the tallest minaret in the world before being supplanted by the  minaret at the Hassan II Mosque in August 1993. However, the mosque still maintains the distinction of having the world's tallest group of minarets.

Architecture and features 

The design of the Sultan Salahuddin Abdul Aziz Shah Mosque is a combination of Malay and Modernist styles, and elements of Malay and Islamic architecture are incorporated into the finishes of the building. Fine decorative khat (Arabic calligraphy) can be seen on the inner curve of the dome and parts of the walls. The calligraphy work was executed by the Egyptian calligrapher Shiekh Abdel Moneim Mohamed Ali El Sharkawi. Intricate aluminium grills are found on the doorways, windows, and walls of the mosque. The windows are fitted with blue stained glass to reduce the amount of light entering the hall. The resulting filtered illumination lends a bluish ambiance to the interior spaces, evoking a sense of peace and serenity. The high ceiling has triangular panels of red balau and ramin timber wood that are set in a crisscrossing pattern. The dome is constructed of aluminium and the outer surface is clad with vitreous enamel-baked triangular steel panels decorated with a rosette of verses from the Qur'an.

The main prayer hall spans two levels, is fully carpeted and air conditioned, and is one of the largest such spaces in the world. The upper gallery of the prayer hall is reserved for female worshippers, and the ground floor contains the reception area, administrative offices, conference rooms, a library, and lecture rooms. The mosque has the capacity to accommodate 12,600 worshippers and is large enough that on a clear day it can be seen from some vantage points in Kuala Lumpur.

The mosque overlooks the Garden of Islamic Arts, a landscaped park inspired by the Quranic Garden of Paradise (Jannah). These 14 hectares of spiritual sanctuary house nine galleries exhibiting a rich array of Islamic arts such as calligraphy, sculptures, paintings, and architecture. The site is occasionally used for traditional Islamic performances.

The design of this mosque was later adapted to the Jami Al-Azhar Jakapermai Mosque in Kalimalang, Bekasi, Indonesia.

See also

 Islam in Malaysia
 List of tallest domes

References

External links
 Tourism Malaysia - Sultan Salahuddin Abdul Aziz Shah Mosque

Mosques in Selangor
Mosques completed in 1988
1988 establishments in Malaysia
20th-century mosques
Mosque buildings with domes